A List of western shore communities on the Gulf of California.

North (Baja California)

San Felipe
Puertecitos
Punta Final
Bahia San Luis Gonzaga
La Gringa
Bahía de los Ángeles
Puerto San Francisquito

South (Baja California Sur) 

Santa Rosalia
San Bruno
Mulegé
(Bahía Concepción)
El Rosarito
Loreto
Loreto Bay
Puerto Escondido
Puerto Agua Verde
San Evaristo
La Paz
Puerto Balandra
El Centenario
Pichilingue
Los Planes
Buenavista
Cabo Pulmo
San José del Cabo

Gulf of California
Geography of Baja California Sur